Maxime Chaya (born December 16, 1961) is a Lebanese sportsman, mountaineer and explorer. On May 15, 2006, he was the first Lebanese to climb Mount Everest, completing the Seven Summits challenge. On December 28, 2007, Max also became the first from the Middle East to reach the South Pole on foot from the Antarctic coast, after an unsupported and unassisted journey that lasted 47 days. Then, on April 25, 2009, he reached the North Pole also on foot, all the way from Canada.

Biography
Maxime Edgard Chaya was born and raised in Beirut until the year 1975 when the civil war saw him and his family take refuge abroad. He pursued his education overseas in Greece, France, Canada and the United Kingdom, graduating with a Bachelor of Science Honors degree from the London School of Economics (LSE).

Chaya then spent a year as a trainee at Republic National Bank of New York's head office on Fifth Avenue before foregoing post-graduate studies and returning home to take over the family's Foreign Exchange business. In 1999, he founded his own company VO2max, and through it, organized races and competitions for Lebanese youth of all ages. Cycling, both road and mountain biking, triathlon, road running, trail-running, rock climbing, ski touring, and freeride were all part of the VO2MAX challenge series of events from 1999 to 2003.

Besides organizing events for others, and the youth in particular, Chaya showed great interest in competing personally, and seemed to excel in every discipline he would adopt. Despite the lack of professional training and advice (owing in part due to the Lebanese Civil War), his rigorous training, coupled with unfailing determination, perseverance and willpower won him several awards and trophies in a host of disciplines both at national and international level.

Chaya now resides in Lebanon with his two children: Edgard and Kelly. Despite work and family life, he has kept his fitness level at the very top but has gradually put down his rackets, skates, and various balls to take up more open-air sports such as trail running, biking, backcountry skiing, and climbing.

Since his partnership with Bank Audi on the "Seven Summits Project" in January 2003, it has been one successful expedition after another for Chaya, acquiring experience, knowledge and wisdom, while discovering new limits within him, and 'Growing Beyond His Potential' summit after summit.

On August 5, 2013, Chaya and his two crew-mates beat the world speed record in rowing the Indian Ocean. The three adventurers, Chaya, the Faroese Livar Nysted and the British Stuart Kershaw crossed  from Geraldton in the Western Australia and rowed alternatively, during 57 days, 19 hours, 25 minutes and 52 seconds exactly. They were also the first crew of three ever to cross any ocean.

In December 2016, Maxime and his British friend and teammate Steve Holyoak were the first ever to cross a sand desert on bicycles. They chose the Empty Quarter and rode their fat bikes unassisted from Abu Dhabi UAE on the Arabian Gulf all the way south to Salalah Oman on the Indian Ocean some 1,500 km and 21 days later.

Major sporting achievements

National
 National champion in several disciplines including squash, cross-country skiing and cycling
 Four times winner of the Redbull Sno-to-Sea (Lebanon – 2003 to 2006)

International
Numerous national representations at international events.
 2nd overall: "Trophée du Nil" (Egypt – 1998)
 3rd overall: "Raid Thai" (Thailand – 1999)
 1st place: "Kenya Sports Safari" (Kenya – 2001)
 23rd: UCI World Masters Championships (Canada – 2001)
 Among the first Lebanese to complete an "Ironman" triathlon (the Netherlands – 2002)

Expeditions

In 2000, while on a visit to Kenya for an international mountain biking stage race that he won, Chaya went on to climb Mount Kilimanjaro in nearby Tanzania. Little did he know that this was to be the first of his 'Seven Summits', and as he watched the sunrise from the roof of Africa, he pondered over his desire to challenge himself yet further on these new sports grounds in the great outdoors: the high mountain.

Over a three-year climbing odyssey, Chaya took on each of the 'Seven Summits' (the highest peak on each continent), raising the Lebanese flag – and national pride – on every occasion. Still intent on thriving, Chaya subsequently went on to achieve the 'Three Poles'.

In 2006, Discovery Channel launched a reality television series entitled Everest: Beyond the Limit. It is a multi-episode documentary that portrays the two-month expedition and the struggles, highs, lows, triumphs and despairs of 11 climbers aspiring to stand on the summit of the world's highest peak. Chaya was one of those climbers. The series turned-out to be a tremendous success to the point that it was repeated in subsequent years, with different climbers in what was known as Series II and Series III.

As Chaya said in many interviews about his Everest expedition, reaching the summit – and more importantly, coming back – should never be taken for granted. This is a serious endeavor that could put even the finest climbers' lives at risk. Everest may not be as technical as some other 8,000 meter peaks, yet its sheer height greatly magnifies any problem that is not dealt with immediately. This – the altitude – is what makes Chomolungma (the Tibetan name for Everest) unique and worthy of all the respect it deserves.

On May 15, 2006, Chaya, exhausted after his successful summit bid, saw his triumph turn to tragedy as he encountered a dying climber on his way back from the summit of Everest. The name of the distressed climber was David Sharp. Chaya and his Tibetan Sherpa Dorjee, tried their best to help. They spent more than an hour next to the stricken climber, whom they did not know, desperately trying to revive him. Unfortunately, Sharp was unconscious and frozen from the knees down. He did not respond to the oxygen administered. Chaya later reported that although very sad of the man's fate, he was confident that nothing more could have been done for him at that stage. "He was much closer to death than he was to life."

Chaya subsequently went on to achieve the Three Poles Challenge. He reached the South Pole – S90 – unassisted and unsupported on December 28, 2007, after setting off from the Hercules Inlet 48 days earlier with his teammates from Canada, Great Britain, Norway and Switzerland. A year and a half later, on April 25, 2009, Chaya and his two teammates from the USA reached the North Pole – N90 – after a 53 days on the ice unassisted.  He then became the 16th person to achieve the Three Poles Challenge and the 6th ever to achieve both the Seven Summits and the Three Poles Challenge.

Still intent on thriving, Chaya took to the high seas. After years of planning, preparation and training he set off from Geraldton, Western Australia on June 9, 2013 aboard his rowboat "tRIO". Along with his two crewmates from the Faroe Islands and Great Britain they reached Mauritius 57 days later on August 5. The trio were awarded two Guinness World Records when the Ocean Rowing Society homologated their time as the fastest row across the Indian Ocean in 57 days 15 hours 49 minutes. They are also the first three-man crew ever to row an ocean. Chaya is believed to be the only person ever to have succeeded in climbing the Seven Summits, reaching the Three Poles Challenge and rowing an ocean.

Climbed peaks and reached landmarks

 Mont Blanc (France/Italy)
 Cho Oyu (Tibet/Nepal)
 Mount Aspiring (New Zealand)
 The Geographical North Pole (the Arctic Circle)
 The South Pole (Antarctica)
 Mount Ama Dablam (Nepal)
 The Matterhorn (Switzerland/Italy)

Climbed, and raised the Lebanese flag on all Seven Summits
 Mount Kilimanjaro – 5,895m (Tanzania – September 2001)
 Mount McKinley/Denali – 6,196m (Alaska – June 2003)
 Aconcagua – 6,961m (Argentina – January 2004)
 Vinson Massif – 4,892m (Antarctica – December 2004)
 Mount Elbrus – 5,642m (Russia – July 2005)
 Carstensz Pyramid – 4,884m (Indonesia – November 2005)
 Mount Everest – 8,848m (Tibet / Nepal – May 2006)

Public recognition

Awards and distinctions

December 2003: Knighted by the President of the Republic. "National Order of the Cedar" – Rank: Knight.
May 2006: Decorated by the President of the Republic. "National Order of the Cedar" – Rank: Officer.
May 2008: Awarded the "Paul Harris Fellowship" by the Rotary Foundation of Rotary International.

Stamps
July 2007: Postal Stamp Issued by the Ministry of Finance commemoration Chaya's ascent of Mount Everest
April 2008: Fiscal Stamp Issued by the Ministry of Finance commemorating Chaya's South Pole Success.

Calling cards
March 2008: Kalam Cards (calling cards) issued by the Ministry of Telecommunications commemorating Chaya's successes. Two cards: One commemorating the Everest success on May 15, 2006; and another card commemorating the South Pole success on December 28, 2007.

Inspirational speaking

Schools, Universities and Clubs 
As part of his own CSR, Chaya regularly visits school, universities and clubs across the region delivering his presentation entitled: "There is an Everest for Everyone".

List of some Schools and Universities visited by Maxime Chaya to address and motivate the students:
International College
Antonine Sisters School - Mar Elias Ghazir-Lebanon
Repton School – Dubai
Beirut Modern School
Notre Dame de la Paix des filles de la Charite – Kobayat
Modern Community School
Wellspring Community School Exhibition – Max Museum
Graduation Sagesse Technique
City International School
ACS
American School of Dubai
École des Sœurs des Saints Cœurs – Zahle
Collège des Sœurs des St Cœurs -Kfar Hbaab Ghazir
Lycée Franco - Libanais / Remise des Diplômes
Collège Saint Joseph – Antoura  – Aintoura
Collège des Sœurs des Saints Cœurs – Bouchrieh
Saydet Al Ataya – Dekwaneh
St. Hripsimiantz College
Grand Lycée Franco-Libanais
Alba – Lebanese Academy of Fine Arts
Dubai Women's College
Armenian Mesrobian School
Collège Notre Dame de Jamhour on the independence day celebration November 2010

Companies
Chaya also speaks to companies at annual events. He delivers a more elaborate, corporate presentation also entitled "There is an Everest to Everyone" where he draws the parallel between mountain climbing and the challenge of business and life.

Royal Dutch Shell – Qatar (July 2009)
PepsiCo – Lebanon (June 2009)
Johnson & Johnson – Sharm el Sheikh (May 2008)
United Motors Agency – KSA (April 2008)
Honeywell – Abu Dhabi (April 2008)
Abbott Pharmaceuticals – Sri Lanka (March 2008)
General Motors – UAE (March 2008)
RasGas – Qatar (February 2008)
L'Oréal – United States (January 2008)
OBEGI Consumer Products – Lebanon (June 2007)
Hewlett Packard – Nepal (May 2007)
Schneider Electric – Lebanon (March 2007)
Leo Burnett – Dubai, UAE (February 2007)
Medco – Lebanon (January 2007)
Boston Scientific – Lebanon (July 2006)
Procter & Gamble – Lebanon (January 2006)

Philanthropy

Charities

In spite of controversy concerning mountaineer David Sharp, Chaya is increasingly solicited to endorse and speak on behalf of charities and NGOs across the region and beyond:
Oum El Nour
Tobacco Free Initiative – Lebanon
Arc-En-Ciel
Social and Economic Action for Lebanon (SEAL) – Lebanon
Toufoula – Lebanon
Chance – Lebanon
Heartbeat – Lebanon

NGOs
ThinkGreen

Board memberships
Beirut Marathon Association
World Links

Publications

Book: Steep Dreams: My journey to the Top of the World

Comic book: Maximum Max - Vol.1: Metamorphosis on the Magic Mountain

Comic book: Maximum Max - Vol.2: Prince of Peaks

Lebanon's foremost sportsman and climber, Maxime Chaya was the first person from his country to hoist its flag atop Everest, and he did so en route to ascending the highest mountain on every continent – the Seven Summits – while also skiing to the North and South Poles. Written in conjunction with New York Times bestselling author Richard Buskin, and illustrated with more than 700 stunning, high-quality, comprehensively captioned photos, 'Steep Dreams: My Journey to the Top of the World' tells the story of Max's adventure-based achievements; of his brushes with death in a wide variety of settings, along with the physical pain, mental anguish, soul-searching, emotional highs and ultimate satisfaction of not only surviving, but also learning to contend with the forces and marvels of nature. It is, in short, the gripping, sometimes harrowing, always rewarding tale of one man's incredible trans-global journey and the realization of his most heartfelt lifelong ambition.

References

External links
Chaya's Live Blog
Chaya's Seven Summits Website
Chaya's Personal Website

Summiters of Mount Everest
Living people
Lebanese mountain climbers
1961 births
Officers of the National Order of the Cedar
Sportspeople from Beirut
Alumni of the London School of Economics